Copiparvovirus is a genus of viruses in subfamily Parvovirinae of the virus family Parvoviridae. Pigs and cows are known to serve as natural hosts. There are seven species in this genus.

Taxonomy
The following seven species are assigned to the genus:

Pinniped copiparvovirus 1
Ungulate copiparvovirus 1
Ungulate copiparvovirus 2
Ungulate copiparvovirus 3
Ungulate copiparvovirus 4
Ungulate copiparvovirus 5
Ungulate copiparvovirus 6

Structure
Viruses in genus Copiparvovirus are non-enveloped, with icosahedral and round geometries, and T=1 symmetry. The diameter is around 18-26 nm. Genomes are linear, around 6kb in length.

Life cycle
Viral replication is nuclear. Entry into the host cell is achieved by attachment to host receptors, which mediates clathrin-mediated endocytosis. Replication follows the rolling-hairpin model. DNA-templated transcription, with some alternative splicing mechanism is the method of transcription. The virus exits the host cell by nuclear pore export. Bovine serve as the natural host.

References

External links
 Viralzone: Copiparvovirus
  ICTV 2018 Copiparvovirus

Virus genera
Parvovirinae